The Albion Football Club is an Australian rules football club which has competed in the Western Region Football League (WRFL) since 1961. They are based in the Melbourne suburb of Albion.

History
When Sunshine FC were admitted to the VFA in 1959, the club decided not to support a third open age team in the FDFL. The players from this Sunshine thirds were worried about getting a game by the 1961 season. As Albion was a growth suburb at the time it was decided to create a football club for the suburb so the Albion Football Club was founded.

2020 Albion was relegated to Division 2

2021 Albion Cats add a Netball team in the WRFL Netball Competition

2021 Albion has its first win since round 9 2018

Honours

Grand Finals
 Western Region Football League (Seniors)
 Division One Wins: 
 2010	Albion	14.11.95 d Spotswood	11.12.78
 1986	Albion	14.22.106 d Wembley Park	10.7.67
 1985	Albion	15.10.100 d Sunshine YCW	11.19.85
 1965 Albion 14.11.95 d Parkside	12.12.84

 Division One Losses: 
 1988	Albion	7.4.46 lost to St Albans	10.4.64
 1978	North Footscray	10.12.72 def Albion	9.9.63
 1976	Seddon	9.12.66 def	Albion	7.14.56
 1974	Braybrook 11.10.76 def Albion	9.9.63
 1973	Albion 9.8.62 lost to Braybrook	15.12.102
 1969	Albion 11.16.82	lost to St Albans 13.6.84

 Division Two Wins: 
 1994	Albion	18.12.120 d Sunshine YCW	11.17.83

Western Region Football League (Reserves)
 Division One (8): 2010, 2009, 1988, 1979, 1976, 1975, 1970, 1968  

Western Region Football League (Under Age)
 Division One Under 18 (1): 1992
 Division One Under 18 (1): 2009
 Division One Under 17 (2): 1974, 1975, 
 Division Two Under 17 (1): 1990
 Division Two Under 16 (2): 2011, 2013
 Division Three Under 16 (1): 2002
 Division Two Under 15 (1): 1983
 Division One Under 14 (1): 1971
 Division Three Under 14 (1): 2012
 Division Two Under 12 (3): 2002, 2003, 2007
 Division Three Under 12 (1): 2001
 Division One Under 11 (3): 1977, 1979, 1980
 Division Two Under 11 (3): 1976, 1986, 1988, 
 Division One Under 10 (1): 1978

Victorian Metro Representatives
 2018 Jonathon O'Brien
 2016 Josh Bench

WRFL Best and Fairest
 Western Region Football League (Div 1 Seniors) 1988 J. Taylor
 1965 D. Prior
 1962 J. Gaylor

 Western Region Football League (Div 1 Reserves) 2008 A. Moore
 2005 M. Brasher
 2003 B. Franksen
 1988 G. Bate 
 1977 A. Hall
 1973 W. Trusler

 Western Region Football League (Div 2 Seniors) 1994 D. Page
 1993 D. Page

 Western Region Football League (Div 2 Reserves) 1994 S. Ivkovic

 Western Region Football League (A3 Open Age) 1993 J. Baars
 1991 D. Anderson
 1988 M. Woods

 Western Region Football League (A5 Open Age) 1985 J. Dearaugo

 Western Region Football League (Div 1 Under 18) 2010 J. McPherson
 2005 M. Nicolaides

 Western Region Football League (Div 2 Under 18)' 1993 A. Saliba

Lindsay Patching Memorial Trophy
2019 Chantelle Hyett & Matt Bettin
1988 A. Wright
1976 D. Mills

EJ Whitten Medalists
Division One 
2019 Ladd John 
2018 Nicholas Weightman
2017 Josh Bench

Bibliography
 History of the WRFL/FDFL by Kevin Hillier – 
 History of football in Melbourne's north west'' by John Stoward –

References

External links
Official website

Australian rules football clubs in Melbourne
Australian rules football clubs established in 1961
1961 establishments in Australia
Western Region Football League clubs
Sport in the City of Brimbank